The Old World rats and mice, part of the subfamily Murinae in the family Muridae, comprise at least 519 species. Members of this subfamily are called murines. In terms of species richness, this subfamily is larger than all mammal families except the Cricetidae and Muridae, and is larger than all mammal orders except the bats and the remainder of the rodents.

Description
The Murinae are native to Africa, Europe, Asia, and Australia.  They are terrestrial placental mammals.  They have also been introduced to all continents except Antarctica, and are serious pest animals.  This is particularly true in island communities where they have contributed to the endangerment and extinction of many native animals.

Two prominent murine species have become vital laboratory animals: the brown rat and house mouse are both used as medical subjects.

The murines have a distinctive molar pattern that involves three rows of cusps instead of two, the primitive pattern seen most frequently in muroid rodents.

Fossils
The first known appearance of the Murinae in the fossil record is about 14 million years ago with the fossil genus Antemus. Antemus is thought to derive directly from Potwarmus, which has a more primitive tooth pattern.  Likewise, two genera, Progonomys and Karnimata, are thought to derive directly from Antemus.  Progonomys is thought to be the ancestor of Mus and relatives, while Karnimata was previously thought to lead to Rattus and relatives, although it is now thought to be a member of the extant tribe Praomyini.  All of these fossils are found in the well-preserved and easily dated Siwalik fossil beds of Pakistan. The transition from Potwarmus to Antemus to Progonomys and Karnimata is considered an excellent example of anagenic evolution.

Taxonomy
Most of the Murinae have been poorly studied.  Some genera have been grouped, such as the hydromyine water rats, conilurine or pseudomyine Australian mice, or the phloeomyine Southeast Asian forms. It appears as if genera from Southeast Asian islands and Australia may be early offshoots compared to mainland forms.  The vlei rats in the genera Otomys and Parotomys are often placed in a separate subfamily, Otomyinae, but have been shown to be closely related to African murines in spite of their uniqueness.

Three genera, Uranomys, Lophuromys, and Acomys, were once considered to be murines, but were found to be more closely related to gerbils through molecular phylogenetics.  They have been assigned a new subfamily status, Deomyinae.

Molecular phylogenetic studies of Murinae include Lecompte, et al. (2008), which analyzes African murine species based on the mitochondrial cytochrome b gene and two nuclear gene fragments. Lecompte, et al. (2008) estimates that African murines colonized Africa from Asia approximately 11 million years ago during the Miocene.

The following phylogeny of 16 Murinae genera, based on molecular phylogenetic analysis of the Interphotoreceptor Retinoid Binding Protein (IRBP) gene, is from Jansa & Weksler (2004: 264).

Distribution
The following is a list of Murinae genus divisions ordered by the continents that they are endemic to. Most of the diversity is located in Southeast Asia and Australasia.

Africa
Aethomys division – 1 genus
Arvicanthis division – 6 genera
Colomys division – 3 genera
Dasymys division – 8 genera
Hybomys division – 3 genera
Malacomys division – 1 genus
Oenomys division – 5 genea
Otomyini division/tribe – 3 genera
Stenocephalomys
Eurasia
Apodemus division – 2 genera
Micromys division – 6 genera
Genus Mus
South Asia
Golunda division – 1 genus
Millardia division – 4 genera
Southeast Asia
Dacnomys division – 8 genera
Hadromys division – 1 genus
Maxomys division – 1 genus
Pithecheir division – 6 genera
Rattus division – 21 genera
Philippines
Chrotomys division – 5 genera
Crunomys division – 2 genera
Phloeomys division – 4 genera
Genus Musseromys
Sulawesi
Crunomys division – 2 genera
Echiothrix division – 1 genus
Melasmothrix division – 2 genera
Moluccas
Halmaheramys division – 1 genus
New Guinea
Hydromys division  – 6 genera
Lorentzimys division – 1 genus
Pogonomys division – 11 genera
Uromys division – 5 genera
Xeromys division – 3 genera
Genus Mirzamys
Australia
Pseudomys division – 8 genera

List of species
As of 2005, the Murinae contained 129 genera in 584 species. Musser and Carleton (2005) divided the Murinae into 29 genus divisions.  They treated the Otomyinae as a separate subfamily, but all molecular analyses conducted to date have supported their inclusion in the Murinae as relatives of African genera. In a recent expedition in the Philippines, seven more Apomys mice were added and the genus was proposed to split into two subgenera - Apomys and Megapomys, based on morphological and cytochrome b DNA sequences. In 2021, a major revision was taken of Praomyini.

The tribes are based on the classification by the American Society of Mammalogists. Some of the division placement is based on Pages et al., 2015 and Rowe et al., 2019.

SUBFAMILY MURINAE - Old World rats and mice
Tribe Apodemini
Genus Apodemus - Old World field mice
Genus Rhagamys †
Genus Tokudaia - Ryūkyū spiny rats
Tribe Arvicanthini
Aethomys division
Genus Aethomys - bush rats
Genus Micaelamys
Arvicanthis division
Genus Arvicanthis - unstriped grass mice
Genus Desmomys
Genus Lemniscomys - striped grass mice
Genus Mylomys (African Groove-toothed Rat)
Genus Pelomys - groove-toothed creek rats
Genus Rhabdomys (Four-striped Grass Mouse)
Dasymys division
Genus Dasymys - shaggy swamp rats
Golunda division
Genus Golunda (Indian bush rat)
Hybomys division
Genus Dephomys - defua rats
Genus Hybomys - hump-nosed mice
Genus Stochomys (target rat)
Genus Typomys
Oenomys division
Genus †Canariomys - Canary Islands giant rats
Genus Grammomys
Genus Lamottemys
Genus †Malpaisomys
Genus Oenomys - rufous-nosed rats
Genus Thallomys - acacia rats
Genus Thamnomys - thicket rats
Tribe Hapalomyini
Genus Hapalomys - marmoset rats
Tribe Hydromyini
Chiropodomys division (alternately considered a distinct tribe, Chiropodomyini)
Genus Chiropodomys - pencil-tailed tree mice
Chrotomys division
Genus Apomys
Genus Archboldomys (Mount Isarog shrew rats)
Genus Chrotomys - Luzon striped rats
Genus Soricomys
Genus Rhynchomys - shrew-like rats
Conilurus division
Genus Conilurus - rabbit rats
Genus Leporillus - Australian stick-nest rats
Genus Mesembriomys - tree rats
Haeromys division
Genus Haeromys - pygmy tree mice
Hydromys division
Genus Baiyankamys (formerly in Hydromys)
Genus Crossomys (earless water rat)
Genus Hydromys - water rats
Genus Leptomys
Genus Microhydromys
Genus Mirzamys
Genus Parahydromys
Genus Paraleptomys
Genus Pseudohydromys - New Guinea false water rats
Genus Xeromys (false water rat)
Mallomys division
Genus Abeomelomys
Genus Mallomys - giant tree rats
Genus Mammelomys
Genus Pogonomelomys - Rummler's mosaic tailed rats
Genus Xenuromys (white-tailed New Guinea rat)
Pogonomys division
Genus Anisomys (powerful-toothed rat)
Genus Chiruromys
Genus Hyomys - white-eared rats
Genus Lorentzimys (New Guinea jumping mouse)
Genus Macruromys - New Guinean rats
Genus Pogonomys - prehensile-tailed rats
Pseudomys division
Genus Leggadina
Genus Mastacomys
Genus Notomys - Australian hopping mice
Genus Pseudomys - Australian native mice
Genus Zyzomys - thick-tailed rats
Uromys division
Genus Melomys - banana rats
Genus Paramelomys
Genus Protochromys
Genus Solomys - naked-tailed rats
Genus Uromys - giant naked-tailed rats
Unknown division
Genus Brassomys
Genus Coccymys
Tribe Malacomyini
Genus Malacomys - big-eared swamp rats
Tribe Millardini
Millardia division
Genus Cremnomys
Genus Diomys (Manipur mouse)
Genus Madromys
Genus Millardia - Asian soft-furred rats
Pithecheir division
Genus Pithecheir - monkey-footed rats
Genus Pithecheirops
Tribe Murini
Genus Mus - true mice
Tribe Otomyini
Genus Myotomys - African karoo rats (now classified in Otomys)
Genus Otomys - groove-toothed or vlei rats
Genus Parotomys - whistling rats
Tribe Phloeomyini
Genus Batomys - Luzon and Mindanao forest rats
Genus Carpomys - Luzon rats
Genus Crateromys - cloudrunners
Genus Musseromys - tree mice
Genus Phloeomys - slender-tailed cloud rats
Tribe Praomyini
Genus Chingawaemys - Chingawa forest rat
Genus Colomys (African wading rat)
Genus Congomys
Genus Heimyscus
Genus Hylomyscus - African wood mice
Genus Mastomys - multimammate mice
Genus Montemys
Genus Myomyscus
Genus Nilopegamys
Genus Ochromyscus - rock mice
Genus Praomys - African soft-furred rats
Genus Serengetimys
Genus Stenocephalemys - Ethiopian narrow-headed rats
Genus Zelotomys - stink mice
Tribe Rattini
Berylmys division
Genus Berylmys - white-toothed rats
Bunomys division
Genus Bullimus
Genus Bunomys
Genus Eropeplus (Sulawesian soft-furred rat)
Genus Halmaheramys
Genus Komodomys
Genus Lenomys (trefoil-toothed rat)
Genus Papagomys - Flores giant rats
Genus Paruromys (Sulawesian giant rat)
Genus Paulamys
Species "Rattus" timorensis
Genus Sundamys - giant Sunda rats
Genus Taeromys
Dacnomys division
Genus Chiromyscus (Fea's tree rat)
Genus Dacnomys (Large-toothed giant rat)
Genus Lenothrix (grey tree rat)
Genus Leopoldamys - long-tailed giant rats
Genus Margaretamys - margareta rats
Genus Niviventer - white-bellied rats
Genus Saxatilomys
Genus Tonkinomys
Echiothrix division
Genus Echiothrix
Genus Hyorhinomys
Genus Melasmothrix (lesser Sulawesian shrew rat)
Genus Paucidentomys
Genus Sommeromys
Genus Tateomys - greater Sulawesian shrew rats
Genus Waiomys - Sulawesi water rat
Maxomys division
Genus Crunomys - Philippine and Sulawesian shrew rats
Genus Maxomys (rajah rats)
Micromys division (alternately considered a distinct tribe, Micromyini)
Genus Micromys (Old World harvest mice)
Rattus division
Genus Abditomys
Genus Bandicota - bandicoot rats
Genus Diplothrix
Genus Kadarsanomys
Genus Limnomys
Genus Nesokia (short-tailed bandicoot rat)
Genus Nesoromys
Genus Palawanomys (Palawan rat)
Genus Rattus - typical rats
Genus Tarsomys
Genus Tryphomys (Mearn's Luzon rat)
Srilankamys division
Genus Srilankamys (Ceylonese rats)
Unknown division
Genus Anonymomys (Mindoro rat)
Tribe Vandeleurini
Genus Vandeleuria - long-tailed climbing mice
incertae sedis
Genus †Alormys
Genus †Coryphomys
Genus Hadromys
Genus †Hooijeromys
Genus †Milimonggamys
Genus †Rakasamys
Genus Vernaya (Vernay's Climbing Mouse)
Genus †Spelaeomys

Notes

References

.
.
.
Mammal subfamilies
Taxa named by Johann Karl Wilhelm Illiger